Kyle Allison (born 3 April 1990 in Dunfermline) is a Scottish professional goalkeeper who plays for Scottish Junior club Penicuik Athletic. He has played in the Scottish Football League for Cowdenbeath, Inverness Caledonian Thistle and Dunfermline Athletic and in the Juniors for Linlithgow Rose, Ballingry Rovers and Kelty Hearts before joining Penicuik Athletic.

Career
Allison began his career at Cowdenbeath, making his debut aged 16, coming on as a substitute for David Hay after 23 minutes of Cowdenbeath's 4–2 win over Stranraer on 2 December 2006. He left the club in July 2008, after asking to be released from his contract.

Allison then signed for Inverness Caledonian Thistle playing in their under-19 side in his first season, including in their semi-final of the Scottish Youth Cup against Rangers. Unfortunately he had to go off injured after 30 minutes having suffered a double fracture of his jaw, with Inverness going on to lose 6–2. His first team debut came in August 2009, as Inverness beat Annan Athletic 4–0 in the Scottish League Cup. At the end of the 2009–10 season he was released by Inverness.

On 26 May 2010, Allison joined Dunfermline Athletic on a one-year deal. He made his first appearance for the club on 30 October 2010, as a substitute for the injured Chris Smith as Dunfermline beat Stirling Albion 3–0. His only other appearance for Dunfermline came in a Scottish Cup tie away to Aberdeen on 6 February 2011. Dunfermline lost the game 1–0, the goal coming in injury time when Allison tried to clear a cross but punched the ball against his team-mate Neil McGregor's legs and into the net. At the end of his contract he was released by Dunfermline.

On 6 August 2011, Allison was an unused substitute as a trialist for Stenhousemuir against Brechin City. He then signed for Junior club Linlithgow Rose. In July 2012, Allison signed for Ballingry Rovers and then on 20 June 2014, joined Kelty Hearts.

References

External links 
 
  (Cowdenbeath appearances 2006/07 Wrong name)

Living people
1990 births
Scottish footballers
Cowdenbeath F.C. players
Dunfermline Athletic F.C. players
Inverness Caledonian Thistle F.C. players
Scottish Football League players
Linlithgow Rose F.C. players
Ballingry Rovers F.C. players
Kelty Hearts F.C. players
Penicuik Athletic F.C. players
Scottish Junior Football Association players
Association football goalkeepers